Austria competed at the 2019 World Athletics Championships in Doha, Qatar, from 27 September to 6 October 2019. Austria was represented by four athletes.

Medalists

Results

Men
Track and road events

Field events

Women 
Track and road events

Field events

Combined events – Heptathlon

References

External links
Doha｜WCH 19｜World Athletics

Nations at the 2019 World Athletics Championships
World Championships in Athletics
2019